The Star Awards for Favourite Host was an award presented annually at the Star Awards, a ceremony that was established in 1994.

The category was introduced in 2012, at the 18th Star Awards ceremony; Bryan Wong received the award for his performance in Renaissance. The award was introduced after the discontinuation of the Favourite Onscreen Partners (Variety) award. It was given in honour of a MediaCorp host that is deemed the most popular among the television audience. The nominees were determined by a team of judges employed by MediaCorp; winners were selected by a majority vote from the public via online voting.

Since its inception, the award was given to only one host. Bryan Wong is the most recent and final winner in this category, for his performance in S.N.A.P. Pornsak and Wong have been nominated on two occasions, more than any other host. Pornsak also holds the record for the most nominations without a win.

The award was discontinued from 2014 onwards as the popularity element of the award is already represented in the Top 10 Most Popular Male Artistes and Top 10 Most Popular Female Artistes awards.

Recipients

Each year is linked to the article about the Star Awards held that year.

Category facts

Most nominations

References

External links 

Star Awards